Harrison College may refer to:
 Harrison College (Barbados), a secondary school established in 1733 in Barbados
 Harrison College (Indiana), a former for-profit college based in Indiana